Charles Shannon may refer to:

Charles Shannon West (1829–1885), Texas politician
Charles Haslewood Shannon (1865–1937), English artist
Charles Shannon (artist) (1914–1996), American artist
Charles Shannon (ice hockey) (1916–1974), American ice hockey player
C. Shannon Mallory (1936–2018), Anglican bishop
Charles E. Shannon (1943–2005), Massachusetts state senator

See also
Shannon (surname)